RJ Benjamin is a South African  award-winning vocalist, songwriter, composer, vocal coach, musical director and producer. Ghetto Ruff owner, Lance Stehr, once described him as "the best composer/singer/musician this country [South Africa] has ever produced".

He graduated from the Allenby Campus School Of Contemporary Music in 2000. In those formative years, RJ cemented several professional and personal relationships with fellow Allenby Alumni such as DJ Cleo, Proverb, Elvis Blue and Robin Kohl. Some of his most successful students include winner of Idols SA season 10 Vincent Bones, Vusi Nova, Naaq Musiq and Anatii.

Television career
He was chosen to be head vocal coach on the music talent TV reality show Project Fame. In 2013, he became the Musical Director Of "Idols South Africa" and "Clash Of The Choirs Season 1". He would reprise his role on the SAFTA award-winning "Clash Of The Choirs Season 2" while becoming the "In-House Mentor" on subsequent seasons of Idols South Africa.

Discography

Studio albums
 Who I Am (2004)

In 2004, RJ Benjamin released his debut album Who I Am, through the Ghetto Ruff record label, which has been described as funkadelic [Neo Soul] played by top jazz musicians. This album featured collaborations with the Flash Republic, vocalist Tamara Dey, Kwaito/Hip Hop MC Pitch Black Afro, Artist & Producer Amu and R&B sensation Ishmael. 37MPH and Bongani Fassie also contributed to the album as producers on select tracks.

Swimming in the Soul of Music

RJ Benjamin's 2008 release, Swimming in the Soul of Music, won the award for Best RnB Album at the Metro FM Awards later that year. The album is a mixture of Soul, Jazz and Funk. RJ has said that the album came about when he had lost his way in his life, prompting him to go back to his musical roots so he "drowned" himself in the creation of the album. Collaborators on the album include, Zubz, HHP, Dan Patlansky, Nothende, and Slikour.

House Bound

In 2009, RJ Benjamin recorded Change The World, which introduced him to South Africa's House music audience.  This song of inspiration was featured on the Soul Candi Session 4 compilation album. It became an instant hit on radio stations and dance floors all over South Africa. The track was nominated for a Channel O Award and SAMA (South African Music Awards) for Best Dance Video and Song of the Year, respectively. It was also nominated for Remix of the year at the SAMAs. Following the huge success of Change the World, RJ released the album 'House Bound' which showcased his vocal and writing skills over house music. This flirtation with house music ultimately returned him back to his R&B/Soul roots and core sensibility.

Inside

After three years of a self-imposed sabbatical, RJ Benjamin remixed and "soulified" House tracks featured on his House Bound album, as well as popular House tracks on which he was featured with Dr Duda, DJ Kent and DJ Fresh to create Inside (2012), re-interpreting them into Funk, Soul, Rock, Flamenco, Samba, Jazz and various other styles

Other Work

Filmography

Television

Awards and nominations

References

External links
Official Website
Official Page on Facebook
@RJBenjamin on Twitter
RJ Benjamin's lyrics

21st-century South African male singers
Living people
Year of birth missing (living people)